Alexandre Emile Jean Yersin (22 September 1863 – 1 March 1943) was a Swiss-French physician and bacteriologist. He is remembered as the co-discoverer of the bacillus responsible for the bubonic plague or pest, which was later named in his honour: Yersinia pestis. Another bacteriologist, the Japanese physician Kitasato Shibasaburō, is often credited with independently identifying the bacterium a few days earlier. Yersin also demonstrated for the first time that the same bacillus was present in the rodent as well as in the human disease, thus underlining the possible means of transmission.

Early life and education 

Yersin was born in 1863 in Aubonne, in the canton of Vaud, Switzerland, as the posthumous son of Jean-Alexandre-Marc Yersin from his wife Fanny-Isaline-Emilie Moschell. From 1883 to 1884 he studied medicine at Lausanne, followed by Marburg, and Paris (1884–1886).

Career
In 1886, Yersin entered Louis Pasteur's research laboratory at the École Normale Supérieure, by invitation of Emile Roux, and participated in the development of the anti-rabies serum. In 1888 he received his doctorate with a dissertation titled Étude sur le Développement du Tubercule Expérimental [Study on the Development of Experimental Tubercule] and spent two months with Robert Koch in Germany.

He joined the recently created Pasteur Institute in 1889 as Roux's collaborator and discovered with him the diphtheric toxin, produced by the Corynebacterium diphtheriae bacillus.

In order to practice medicine in France, Yersin applied for and obtained French nationality in 1888. Soon afterwards (1890), he left for French Indochina (current Vietnam, Laos and Cambodia) in Southeast Asia as a physician for the Messageries Maritimes company, on the Saigon-Manila line and then on the Saigon-Haiphong line. He participated in one of the Auguste Pavie missions. In 1894 Yersin was sent by request of the French government and the Pasteur Institute to Hong Kong, to investigate the plague happening there.

There, in a small hut since he was denied access to British hospitals at his arrival, he made his greatest discovery: that of the pathogen which causes the disease. Dr Kitasato Shibasaburō, also in Hong Kong, had identified a bacterium several days earlier. There is controversy whether this was the same pneumococci or a mix of the two. Because Kitasato's initial reports were vague and somewhat contradictory, some give Yersin sole credit for the discovery. However, a 1976 thorough analysis of the morphology of the organism discovered by Kitasato determined that "we are confident that Kitasato had examined the plague bacillus in Hong Kong in late June and early July 1894", only days after Yersin announced his own discovery on 20 June, and that Kitasato "should not be denied this credit". The plague bacillus develops better at lower temperatures, so Yersin's less well-equipped lab turned out to be an advantage in the race with Kitasato, who used an incubator. Therefore, although at first named “Kitasato-Yersin bacillus” by the scientific community, the microbe will later assume only the latter's name because of the one identified by Kitasato, a type of streptococcus, cannot be found in the lymphatic glands. Yersin was also able to demonstrate for the first time that the same bacillus was present in the rodent as well as in the human disease, thus underlining the possible means of transmission. This important discovery was communicated to the French Academy of Sciences in the same year, by his colleague Emile Duclaux, in a classic paper titled "La peste bubonique à Hong-Kong".

From 1895 to 1897, Yersin further pursued his studies on the bubonic plague. In 1895 he returned to the Institute Pasteur in Paris and with Émile Roux, Albert Calmette and Amédée Borrel, prepared the first anti-plague serum. In the same year, he returned to Indochina, where he installed a small laboratory at Nha Trang to manufacture the serum (in 1905 this laboratory became a branch of the Pasteur Institute). Yersin tried the serum received from Paris in Canton and Amoy, in 1896, and in Bombay, India, in 1897, with disappointing results. Having decided to stay in his country of adoption, he participated actively in the creation of the Medical School of Ha Noi in 1902, and was its first director, until 1904.

Yersin tried his hand at agriculture and was a pioneer in the cultivation of rubber trees (Hevea brasiliensis) imported from Brazil into Indochina. For this purpose, he obtained in 1897 a concession from the government to establish an agricultural station at Suoi Dau. He opened a new station at Hon Ba in 1915, where he tried to acclimatize the quinine tree (Cinchona ledgeriana), which was imported from the Andes in South America by the Spaniards, and which produced the first known effective remedy for preventing and treating malaria, a disease which prevails in Southeast Asia to this day.

Alexandre Yersin is well remembered in Vietnam, where he was affectionately called Ông Năm (Mr Nam/Fifth) by the people.

On 8 January 1902, Yersin was accredited to be the first Headmaster of Hanoi Medical University by the Governor-General of French Indochina, future president of France Paul Doumer.

In 1934 he was nominated honorary director of Pasteur Institute and a member of its Board of Administration.

Death and legacy in Vietnam
He died at his home in Nha Trang, in 1943.

Following the country's independence, streets named in his honor kept their designation and his tomb in Suoi Dau was graced by a pagoda where rites are performed in his worship. Yersin Market in Ho Chi Minh City was named after him. His house in Nha Trang is now the Yersin Museum, and the epitaph on his tombstone describes him as a "Benefactor and humanist, venerated by the Vietnamese people".

In Ha Noi, the Lycée français Alexandre Yersin, a French international school was named after him.

A private university founded in 2004 in Da Lat was named "Yersin University" in his honour [Trường Đại Học Yersin Đà Lạt].

Miscellaneous 

Dr Yersin was credited with founding the site for the new town of Da Lat in 1893. Because of the high altitude and European-like climate, Da Lat became an R&R spot for French officers. There was a high school named after him which was built in the 1920s, the Lycée Yersin, aka Grand Lycée (grade 6 to 12), the Petit Lycée (elementary to grade 5), and a university named after him which was built in the 2000s.

While in Hong Kong, Yersin was helped in his research by an Italian priest of the PIME order named Bernardo Vigano. He provided cadavers and assisted with his quest to find a remedy for the plague.

References

Bibliography

English

French 

 
 Patrick Deville, Peste et choléra, éditions du Seuil, collection « Fiction & Cie », 2012.

Other languages

External links

 Alexandre Yersin and his adventures in Vietnam
 Other Colleagues of Louis Pasteur, Pasteur Brewing
 Alexandre Yersin. Repères chronologiques. Institut Pasteur, Paris (In French).

1863 births
1943 deaths
People from Aubonne
Nha Trang
Swiss bacteriologists
University of Lausanne alumni
Plague (disease)
Health in Vietnam
Recipients of the Legion of Honour